Scot Gresham-Lancaster (born 1954 in Redwood City, California) is an American composer, performer, instrument builder, educator and educational technology specialist. He uses computer networks to create new environments for musical and cross discipline expression. As a member of The Hub, he is one of the early pioneers of "computer network" music, which uses the behavior of interconnected music machines to create innovative ways for performers and computers to interact. He performed in a series of "co-located" performances, collaborating in real time with live and distant dancers, video artists and musicians in network-based performances.

As a student, he studied with Philip Ianni, Roy Harris, Darius Milhaud, John Chowning, Robert Ashley, Terry Riley, Robert Sheff, David Cope, and Jack Jarret, among others. In the late 1970s, he worked closely with Serge Tcherepnin, helping with the construction and distribution of Serge's Serge Modular Music System. He went on to work at Oberheim Electronics. In the early 1980s, he was the technical director at the Mills College Center for Contemporary Music. He has taught at California State University, Hayward, Diablo Valley College, Ex'pression College for Digital Arts, Cogswell College, and San Jose State University. He taught at University of Texas at Dallas in the School of Arts Technology and Emerging Communication (ATEC) until 2017, and is currently a Visiting Researcher at CNMAT, UC Berkeley. He is also a Research Scientist at the ArtSci Lab at ATEC.

He was a composer in residence at Mills College Center for Contemporary Music. At STEIM in Amsterdam, he has worked to develop new families of controllers to be used exclusively in the live performance of electroacoustic music. He is an alumnus of the Djerassi Artist Residency Program. He has toured and recorded as a member of The Hub, Room (with Chris Brown, Larry Ochs and William Winant), Alvin Curran, ROVA saxophone quartet, the Club Foot Orchestra, and the Dutch ambient group NYX. He has performed the music of Alvin Curran, Pauline Oliveros, John Zorn, and John Cage, under their direction, and worked as a technical assistant to Lou Harrison, Iannis Xenakis, David Tudor, Edmund Campion, Cindy Cox and among many others.

Since 2006, he has collaborated with media artist Stephen Medaris Bull in a series of "karaoke cellphone operas" with initial funding provided by New York State Council for the Arts. He has worked in collaboration with Dallas theater director Thomas Riccio developing sonic interventions for many of his productions.

Publications

 Experiences in Digital Terrain: Using Digital Elevation Models for Music and Interactive Multimedia
 The Aesthetics and History of the Hub: The Effects of Changing Technology on Network Computer Music
 Mixing in the Round
 Flying Blind: Network and feedback based systems in real time interactive music performances
 No There, There: A personal history of telematic performance

Discography

 The HUB: Boundary Layer (3-CD retrospective) Tzadik TZ 8050-3
 Orchestrate Clang Mass, solo work Live Interactive Electronics (1983-2001) (2003 OCM publishing)
 Fuzzybunny with Chris Brown and Tim Perkis Sonore 2001
 The HUB: Wrecking Ball (Hub 2nd CD) Artifact 010
 Yearbook Vol. 1 Track 5 Rastascan
 Nonstop Flight (HUB with Deep Listening Band) Music and Arts
 Metropolis (Clubfoot Orchestra)
 Voys vol.1 (Voys)
 Electric Rags New Albion
 NYX Axis Mundi (with Bert Barten) Lotus Records
 Gino Robair: Other Destinations Rastascan Records
 Vol. 17 CDCM Computer Music Series (Chain reaction) CDCM
 Room (Hall of Mirrors) Music and Art
 The HUB: Computer Network Music, Artifact 002
 Talking Drum: Chris Brown, Pogus 21034

Notes

External links
Golden, Barbara. "Conversation with Chris Brown and Scot Gresham-Lancaster." eContact! 12.2 — Interviews (2) (April 2010). Montréal: CEC.
Golden, Barbara. "Conversation with Scot Gresham-Lancaster." eContact! 12.2 — Interviews (2) (April 2010). Montréal: CEC.
Cellphonia. "Mission: Cellphonia explores the social, technological, and creative possibilities of cell phones with bias to encourage new applications for cultural growth."  (2006-present).

1954 births
Living people
Musicians from the San Francisco Bay Area
American male composers
21st-century American composers
California State University, East Bay faculty
People from Redwood City, California
21st-century American male musicians